Army Air Corps may refer to the following army aviation corps:

 Army Air Corps (United Kingdom), the army aviation element of the British Army
 Philippine Army Air Corps (1935–1941)
 United States Army Air Corps (1926–1942), or its predecessors or successors

See also
 Army Aviation Corps (disambiguation)
 List of army aviation units for other units that may also be informally termed Air Corps